The Bahe Formation is a Late Miocene (Tortonian/Vallesian/Bahean, about 11.6 to 9.0 mya) geological formation in Shaanxi, China. It has "a complex lithology of predominantly orange-yellow conglomerates, sandstones, tan-yellow sandy mudstones, and tan-red mudstones." The main fossil locality is in the Jiulaopo region on the left bank of the Bahe River in Lantian.

Geology and environment 
Six general facies have been identified in the region: (1) massive or crudely bedded conglomerates, (2) cross-stratified conglomerate and sandstone deposits, (3) minor sandstone deposits, (4) fine-grained deposits, (5) gritty mudstone and sandstone deposits and (6) marl deposits.

The presence of these types of facies suggest active channels, crevasse splays, sheet floods, and floodplains with paleosols and lakes. Thick and laterally pervasive units of fine-grained sediments, formed as suspension fall-out on the floodplain, indicating low-energy conditions and a relatively gentle surface gradient in the area, are by far the most common sedimentary component. Channel-related sandstones and conglomerates indicate that the rivers had a low-sinuosity and were braided, to anastomosing types.

Fossil content

Mammals

Turtles

References 

Geologic formations of China
Neogene System of Asia
Miocene Series
Tortonian
Conglomerate formations
Sandstone formations
Mudstone formations
Marl formations
Fluvial deposits
Paleontology in Shaanxi